The 1906–07 British Home Championship was an international football tournament between the British Home Nations. For the first time ever it was won undisputed by the Welsh team, who secured two victories and a draw to take them to the top of the table. They were followed by England and Scotland, who both played well but could not overhaul the Welsh points advantage. All three teams beat Ireland, who finished without a point.

As usual, England and Ireland began the tournament, England winning a close game by a single goal from Harold Hardman. In Belfast during the second match, despite a close contest and five goals, Wales managed to beat the Irish 3–2 and join England at the top of the table. Wales then beat Scotland in a surprise result, winning 1–0 in Wrexham by a goal from veteran Grenville Morris to become tournament favourites. Scotland recovered in their second game with a three-goal rout of Ireland, finishing a miserable tournament for the Irish. Wales and England then played, the Welsh needing a win to take the competition undisputed whilst a draw would leave them waiting for the result of the England versus Scotland game. In the event the match finished 1–1 and England played Scotland in Newcastle needing a win to draw level with Wales. In the event, Scotland proved too good and the game finished with a 2–2 draw, handing the championship to Wales for the first time.

Table

Results

Winning squad

References

1907 in British sport
Brit
Brit
1906–07 in English football
1906–07 in Scottish football
1906-07